Eastern Shore may refer to:

 Eastern Shore (Nova Scotia), a region
 Eastern Shore (electoral district), a provincial electoral district in Nova Scotia
 Eastern Shore of Maryland, a region
 Eastern Shore of Virginia, a region
 Eastern Shore (Alabama), of Mobile Bay
 , a United States Navy cargo ship in commission from 1918 to 1919